David B. Fein (born August 29, 1960) is an American attorney who served as the United States Attorney for the District of Connecticut from 2010 to 2013.

References

1960 births
Living people
United States Attorneys for the District of Connecticut
Connecticut Democrats
Dartmouth College alumni
New York University School of Law alumni